Vinod Gopal (born May 18, 1985) is an American Democratic politician who took office on January 9, 2018 to represent the 11th Legislative District in the New Jersey Senate, which covers portions of Monmouth County. Prior to his election to the Senate, Gopal served as Chairman of the Monmouth County Democratic Party.

Early life 
Gopal's family is from Southern India. His parents came to the United States in the early 1970s and settled in New Jersey. Gopal was born in Neptune Township and grew up in Freehold Township. He graduated in 2003 from Ranney School in Tinton Falls, New Jersey. Gopal holds a bachelor's degree from Pennsylvania State University and a master's degree from Rutgers University. He is the founder and president of Direct Development, LLC and owner of the Monmouth County-based Community Magazine. He grew Direct Development to two locations – in Hazlet and Tinton Falls. He is a resident of Long Branch. While in high school and college, Senator Gopal served as a volunteer Emergency Medical Technician and First Responder and Certified First Aid Instructor for the Colts Neck Township and Freehold Township First Aid Squads. Gopal served on the Board of Trustees of Big Brothers, Big Sisters of Monmouth County from 2010 to 2012. Gopal previously served on the board of directors of the Northern Monmouth Chamber of Commerce, now called the Monmouth County Chamber of Commerce, from 2009 to 2012. From 2010 to 2013, Gopal served as President of the Hazlet Business Owners Association. Gopal is also President of the Vin Gopal Civic Association, a 501c3 organization, which helps local families and charities in need.

New Jersey General Assembly Campaign 
In 2011, Gopal, at the age of 26, ran for the office of Assembly in the 11th Legislative District alongside Red Bank Councilwoman Kathleen Horgan. Gopal and Horgan were defeated by Republican incumbents Caroline Casagrande and Mary Pat Angelini.

Monmouth Democratic Party 
The following year, Gopal ran for Chairman of the Monmouth County Democratic Organization. He was elected Chairman with 73% of the vote. As Chairman, Gopal led the 2015 campaign for General Assembly, where he helped oust Republican incumbents Caroline Casagrande and Mary Pat Angelini by newcomers Eric Houghtaling and Joann Downey, in what was widely considered a major upset. As Chairman, Gopal was featured in PolitickerNJ.com's 100 Most Powerful people in New Jersey Politics in 2015 and 2016. In 2017, Gopal resigned the Chairmanship, announcing his intention to run for Senate in the 11th Legislative District against Republican incumbent Jennifer Beck. Gopal ran alongside first-term Democratic incumbents Assemblyman Eric Houghtaling and Assemblywoman Joann Downey.

New Jersey Senate 
In November 2017, Gopal was elected to the State Senate. Gopal is the first Indian-American to be elected to New Jersey's State Senate, and his victory was described by NJ.com as "perhaps the biggest upset of the night." Gopal won by 4,158 votes – dramatically outperforming Democratic Gubernatorial Candidate Phil Murphy. Gopal won numerous towns which Murphy lost, including Eatontown and Ocean Township. On January 9, 2018, shortly after his swearing-in, Gopal was appointed Vice-Chairman of the Senate Transportation Committee as well as a member of the Economic Growth Committee and Health, Human Services and Senior Citizens Committee. He is currently the youngest member of the New Jersey State Senate. On April 4, 2018, Gopal was named Senate Majority Conference Leader and Chairman of the Bipartisan Legislative Manufacturing Caucus. Gopal took both positions from Senator Robert M. Gordon, who resigned to accept a position with the BPU. On January 1 of 2019, Gopal was appointed Chairman of the Senate Military and Veterans Affairs Committee.

In the 2021 elections, Republicans outperformed expectations statewide, with Republican gubernatorial candidate Jack Ciattarelli winning 2,500 more votes than incumbent Governor Phil Murphy in the 11th district and both Houghtaling and Downey losing re-election. Gopal nevertheless was narrowly re-elected as Senator by a margin of approximately 2,600 votes, running more than 5,000 votes ahead of Murphy; he was the only Democratic state legislator to win in a district carried by Ciattarelli. As a result of Houghtaling and Downey's losses, he was also left as the only Democrat representing Monmouth County in the state legislature.

Committees 
Military and Veterans' Affairs
Higher Education
Health, Human Services and Senior Citizens

District 11
Each of the 40 districts in the New Jersey Legislature has one representative in the New Jersey Senate and two members in the New Jersey General Assembly. The representatives from the 11th District for the 2022—23 Legislative Session are:
Senator Vin Gopal (D)
Assemblywoman Kimberly Eulner (R)
Assemblywoman Marilyn Piperno (R)

Electoral history

Senate

Assembly

See also 
 Community journalism
 Indian Americans in New Jersey

References 

1985 births
American politicians of Indian descent
Living people
Democratic Party New Jersey state senators
Pennsylvania State University alumni
People from Freehold Township, New Jersey
Politicians from Long Branch, New Jersey
People from Neptune Township, New Jersey
Ranney School alumni
21st-century American politicians